Franck Tisnés (15 December 1881 – 12 December 1964) was a French equestrian. He competed in the individual jumping event at the 1920 Summer Olympics.

References

External links
 

1881 births
1964 deaths
French male equestrians
Olympic equestrians of France
Equestrians at the 1920 Summer Olympics
People from Castres
Sportspeople from Tarn (department)